The Game is a children's fantasy novel written by Diana Wynne Jones. It explores a young girl's life and her relation to the "Mythosphere." This book pulls heavily from Greek and even some Russian mythology.

Plot 
Hayley's parents disappeared when she was a baby. Since then, she has been raised and homeschooled by her grandparents. Grandad is overworked and travels a lot; Grandma is much too strict and never lets her meet any children her own age. When Hayley does something wrong—she is not quite sure what—they pack her off to her aunts in Ireland. To Hayley's shock, her family is much bigger than she thought; to her delight, the children all play what they call “the game,” where they visit a place called “the mythosphere.” And while she plays the game, Hayley learns more about her own place in the world than she had ever expected.

Hayley encounters various mythological figures during the course of her adventures in the mythosphere, including Actaeon and Baba Yaga.

Characters 
 Hayley
 Grandpa
 Grandma
 Flute
 Fiddle
 Uncle Jolyon
 Uncle Mercer
 7 Aunts
 Troy
 Harmony
 Tollie
 More cousins
 5 other Aunts
 Hayley's dad Sisyphus
 Hayley's mum Merope
 Martya

References

External links

2007 British novels
2007 children's books
2007 fantasy novels
British fantasy novels
British children's novels
Children's fantasy novels
Novels by Diana Wynne Jones
HarperCollins books